Ron Jelinek (born 1945) was a member of both houses of the Michigan Legislature–of the Michigan House of Representatives from 1997–2002, and of the Senate from 2003–2010.

Jelinek has a bachelor's degree from Michigan State University and a master's degree in education from Western Michigan University.  He taught agricultural classes, industrial education classes and science classes in River Valley School District from 1967 to 1996.

Jelinek was elected to the Michigan State House in 1996, and served in that body until elected to the state senate in 2002.  Jelinek and his wife Diane Fabian are the parents of three children. Diane died in 2009.

References

Sources
Project Vote Smart bio

1945 births
Michigan State University alumni
Western Michigan University alumni
Members of the Michigan House of Representatives
Michigan state senators
Living people
People from Three Oaks, Michigan
20th-century American politicians
21st-century American politicians